Ferdousi Mazumder (born 18 June 1943) is a Bangladeshi film, television and stage actress. She was awarded Ekushey Padak (1998, Independence Day Award and Ekushey Padak (2020) by the Government of Bangladesh. As of 2009, on stage she has given over 1200 performances of about 35 plays, mostly for her own group, Theatre.

Early life
Mazumder was an intermediate student of Eden College. She earned her master's degree in both Bengali and Arabic from the University of Dhaka.

Career
Mazumder started her drama career through her brother, Munier Chowdhury, a playwright and novelist. She first acted in the drama Daktar Abdullahar Karkhana, written by Shawkat Osman, which was a production of the then Iqbal Hall of the University of Dhaka. Ferdousi also acted at the very first televised drama of Bangladesh Television, Ektala Dotala (1964). Over the years, she performed in plays like Kokilara, a one-woman play, Eka, a one-character non-verbal play, Tamoshi, written by Nilima Ibrahim and others. She directed five stage plays including Meherjan Arekbar, Tahara Tokhono, Chithi and Dui Bon.

After the independence of Bangladesh, in 1972, a group of Chhatra Shikkhak Natya Goshthi members formed a theatre troupe calling it Theatre. Majumdar was one of the founding members of the troupe.

Personal life
Mazumder is married to Ramendu Majumdar since around 1970. Together they have a daughter, Tropa Mazumder. Her father, Khan Bahadur Abdul Halim Chowdhury, was a district magistrate. Her brother Munier Chowdhury was an intellectual. Another brother, Kabir Chowdhury, was a professor and intellectual.

Awards
 Independence Day Award (2020)
 Ekushey Padak (1998)
 William Kerry Award (1998) 
 Bangladesh Shilpakala Academy Award for Best Actor (1978)
 First National TV Award for Best Acting (1975)
 Sequence Award of Merit for performance in TV for a decade

Works

References

1943 births
Living people
Bangladeshi stage actresses
Bangladeshi television actresses
Bangladeshi film actresses
20th-century Bangladeshi actresses
Recipients of the Ekushey Padak in arts
Honorary Fellows of Bangla Academy
Recipients of the Independence Day Award
University of Dhaka alumni
Eden Mohila College alumni
Place of birth missing (living people)
Meril-Prothom Alo Lifetime Achievement Award winners
Best Supporting Actress Bachsas Award winners
People from Chatkhil Upazila